Kravany is a village and municipality in the Poprad District in the Prešov Region of eastern Slovakia.

References

External links
https://web.archive.org/web/20160731035859/http://kravany.e-obce.sk/
http://www.spis.eu.sk/kravany/
Detailed map of Kravany

Villages and municipalities in Poprad District